Night People is the debut studio album by English new wave band Classix Nouveaux, released in 1981 by record label Liberty. It reached number 66 in the UK Albums Chart. It peaked at number 85 in Australia.

Track listing

Personnel
Sal Solo - voice, keyboards, synthesizer, guitar
Mik Sweeney - bass guitar, keyboards, synthesizer, backing vocals
Gary Steadman - guitar, guitar synthesizer
B.P. Hurding - drums, electronic percussion, saxophone, backing vocals
Technical
Rob Arenstein - engineer
Falcon Stuart - management
John Pasche - sleeve design
Ron Mercer - watch illustration

References

External links 

 

1981 debut albums
Classix Nouveaux albums
Liberty Records albums